Plicatol C is one of the three phenanthrenes that can be isolated from the stems of the orchid Flickingeria fimbriata.

See also 
 Plicatol A
 Plicatol B

References

External links 
 Plicatol C at kanaya.naist.jp/knapsack_jsp

Phenanthrenoids
Flickingeria